The 28th Military Airlift Squadron is an inactive United States Air Force unit. Its last was assigned to the 62d Military Airlift Wing at Hill Air Force Base, Utah, where it was inactivated in April 1969.

The squadron was first activated as the 28th Transport Squadron in 1942. As the 28th Troop Carrier Squadron the unit saw combat in the European and Mediterranean Theaters. It earned a Distinguished Unit Citation for its combat performance.

The 28th Logistic Support Squadron was activated in 1953 at Hill Air Force Base, Utah under Air Materiel Command (AMC) as an airlift unit for special weapons under AMC control. The squadron also provided other airlift support as a secondary mission. In 1962 the squadron transferred to Military Air Transport Service.

The two squadrons were consolidated in 1985 as the 18th Airborne Command and Control Squadron but have not been active since that date.

History

World War II 
Established as part of the Army Air Corps on 1 February 1942 at Daniel Field, Georgia. Equipped with C-47 Skytrain transports as one of the original four squadrons of the 89th Transport Group. The 89th group provided transition training for transport pilots. However, a little more than three months later, the squadron was reassigned to the 60th Transport Group at Westover Field, Massachusetts.

The 60th group at Westover was preparing for shipment overseas, and the squadron trained and trained for combat resupply and casualty evacuation missions. Was ordered deployed to England, assigned to Eighth Air Force in June 1942. Assigned fuselage code 3D. Performed intro-theater transport flights of personnel, supply and equipment within England during summer and fall of 1942, reassigned to Twelfth Air Force after Operation Torch invasion of North Africa in November 1942, transporting paratroopers to Oran, Algeria during the early hours of Operation Torch.

In combat, performed resupply and evacuation missions across Morocco, Algeria and Tunisia during North African Campaign. During June 1943, the unit began training with gliders in preparation for Operation Husky, the invasion of Sicily. It towed gliders to Syracuse, Sicily and dropped paratroopers at Catania during the operation. After moving to Sicily, the squadron airdropped supplies to escaped prisoners of war in Northern Italy in October.

The unit provided support for partisans operating in the Balkans. Its unarmed aircraft flew at night over uncharted territory, landing at small unprepared airfields to provide guns, ammunition, clothing, medical supplies, gasoline, and mail to the partisans. It even carried jeeps and mules as cargo. On return trips it evacuated wounded partisans, evadees and escaped prisoners. These operations earned the squadron the Distinguished Unit Citation. It also dropped paratroopers at Megava, Greece in October 1944 and propaganda leaflets in the Balkans in the Mediterranean Theater of Operations until end of combat in Europe, May 1945.

After hostilities ended, was transferred to Waller Field, Trinidad attached to the Air Transport Command Transported personnel and equipment from Brazil to South Florida along the South Atlantic Air Transport Route. Squadron picked up personnel and equipment in Brazil or bases in Northern South America with final destination being Miami, Boca Raton Army Airfield or Morrison Fields in South Florida. Inactivated at the end of July 1945.

Special Airlift 
The 28th Logistic Support Squadron was activated at Hill Air Force Base, Utah and equipped with Douglas C-124 Globemaster IIs in July 1953. Its mission was to provide worldwide airlift of special weapons and related equipment, with a secondary mission to airlift other Department of Defense cargo as required when space was available.

In 1955 Air Materiel Command organized the 3079th Aviation Depot Wing to exercise command jurisdiction over all its logistic support squadrons. Previously, the 7th, 19th and 28th Logistic Support Squadrons had been assigned to separate air materiel areas. The 3097th wing also commanded aviation depot groups responsible for the storage and maintenance of special weapons.

In 1962 the squadron was transferred to Military Air Transport Service (MATS)'s 1501st Air Transport Wing at Travis Air Force Base, California. It was redesignated the 28th Air Transport Squadron, but remained at Hill with the same mission (as indicated by the "Special" added to its designation). When MATS became Military Airlift Command in 1966, the squadron was renamed the 28th Military Airlift Squadron and its headquarters, now the 60th Military Airlift Wing, remained at Travis. In 1967, the 60th wing retired its C-124s and the squadron was reassigned to the 62d Military Airlift Wing, which now had the global special weapons airlift support mission. The squadron was inactivated in the spring of 1969.

Lineage 

 28th Troop Carrier Squadron
 Constituted as the 28th Transport Squadron (Mail & Cargo) on 19 January 1942
 Activated on 1 February 1942
 Redesignated 28th Transport Squadron on 19 May 1942
 Redesignated 28th Troop Carrier Squadron 4 July 1942
 Inactivated on 31 July 1945
 Consolidated with the 28th Military Airlift Squadron on 19 September July 1985 as the 18th Airborne Command & Control Squadron

 28th Military Airlift Squadron
 Constituted as the 28th Logistic Support Squadron on 28 April 1953
 Activated on 8 July 1953
 Redesignated 28th Air Transport Squadron, Special on 18 January 1962
 Redesignated 28th Military Airlift Squadron, Special on 8 January 1966
 Inactivated on 8 April 1969
 Consolidated with the 28th Troop Carrier Squadron on 19 September 1985 as the 18th Airborne Command and Control Squadron

18th Airborne Command and Control Squadron (not active)

Assignments 
 89th Transport Group 1 February 1942
 60th Transport Group (later 60th Troop Carrier Group), 19 May 1942 – 31 July 1945
 Ogden Air Materiel Area, 8 July 1953 (attached to 2849th Air Base Wing)
 3079th Aviation Depot Wing, 8 February 1955
 1501st Air Transport Wing, 18 January 1962
 60th Military Airlift Wing, 8 January 1966 (attached to 62d Military Airlift Wing 1–8 July 1967)
 62d Military Airlift Wing, 8 July 1967 – 8 April 1969

Stations 

 Daniel Field, Georgia, 1 February 1942
 Harding Field, Louisiana, 8 March 1942
 Westover Field, Massachusetts, 20 May 1942 – 7 July 1942
 RAF Podington (Station 109), England, 28 July 1942
 RAF Aldermaston (Station 467), England, 7 August 1942
 Tafaraoui Airfield, Algeria, 14 November 1942
 Rélizane (Galizan) Airfield, Algeria, 27 November 1942

 Thiersville Airfield, Algeria, 13 May 1943,
 El Djem Airfield, Tunisia, 1 July 1943
 Gela East Airfield, Sicily, Italy, 4 September 1943
 Gerbini Airfield, Sicily, Italy, 28 October 1943
 Pomigliano d'Arco Airfield, Campania, Italy, 8 October 1944 – May 1945
 Waller Field, Trinidad 2 June 1945 – 31 July 1945
 Hill Air Force Base, Utah, 8 July 1953 – 8 April 1969

Aircraft 
 Douglas C-47, 1942–1945
 Douglas C-124 Globemaster II, 1952–1969

Awards and Campaigns

References

Notes 
 Explanatory notes

 Citations

Bibliography 

 
 
 
 
 
 AF Pamphlet 900-2, Unit Decorations, Awards and Campaign Participation Credits Department of the Air Force, Washington, DC, 15 June 1971

 Further reading
 

028